Alicia Jane Blagg (born 21 October 1996) is a British former diver.

In 2010 Blagg became the England's youngest ever double national champion when she won both the 1 metre springboard and 3 metre synchronised titles in the British championships.
In 2012 she was selected to represent Great Britain in the 2012 London Olympics in the Women's synchronised 3 metre springboard event. In 2016 she competed in 3m springboard synchronized diving representing GB in 2016 Rio Olympics alongside Rebecca Gallantree, and they finished in the 5th place.

According to her instagram profile she is based in Leeds and Miami as of 2017, having moved to America for university.

In July 2020 Alicia announced her retirement from professional diving due to a shoulder injury. She is planning to study for a master's degree in forensic psychology with criminology.

References

External links
 
 
 
 
 
 
 
 
 

1996 births
Living people
English female divers
British criminologists
British women criminologists
Forensic psychologists
British women psychologists
Olympic divers of Great Britain
Divers at the 2012 Summer Olympics
Divers at the 2016 Summer Olympics
Commonwealth Games gold medallists for England
Commonwealth Games medallists in diving
Divers at the 2014 Commonwealth Games
Divers at the 2018 Commonwealth Games
Sportspeople from Wakefield
Medallists at the 2014 Commonwealth Games
Medallists at the 2018 Commonwealth Games